Kyethi()(Kyethi or Kehsi) is the main town of Kyethi Township, Loilem District, in the Shan State of Burma. The main town is Kesi (Kyethi or Kehsi). Highway 442 passes through Kyethi town.

History
Kehsi, located by the Nam Heng River, was the capital of Kehsi Mansam, one of the Shan States. It had a population of 618 in 1901.

References

Townships of Shan State
Loilen District
Capitals of former nations